Aristolochia pontica is a species of perennial plant in the family Aristolochiaceae. It is found in the Republic of Georgia, Turkey, Lebanon, and Greece.

References

External links

pontica